VHR may refer to:

 Victorian Heritage Register, in the State of Victoria, Australia
 Radio VHR, in the List of German-language radio stations
 Very-high-resolution, imagery of the Pleiades Earth-imaging satellites
 V. Hanumantha Rao, political leader from the Indian National Congress